Dulchasar is a village located in Sridungargarh sub district, Bikaner district of Rajasthan state, India.

As of the 2011 Census of India, Dulchaser has a population of 4,633 people made up of 2,304 males, and 2,329 females. There are 657 families, and the number of children aged 6 or younger is 934. With a literacy rate of 68%, the village has higher literacy than the Rajasthan state average. There are 1,870 workers, with 1,406 being farmers (owners or co-owners), and 96 employed as agricultural labourers.

References

Villages in Bikaner district 
Bikaner district